Catabenoides vitrina is a moth of the family Noctuidae first described by Francis Walker in 1857. It is found from California to western Texas and south through Mexico to Central America. It is also found in the Caribbean, including Cuba.

The wingspan is 22–26 mm. The forewings are light brownish gray with several black longitudinal lines. The hindwings are white with some brownish-gray shading along the upper half of the outer margin.

References

Cuculliinae
Moths of North America
Moths of the Caribbean
Fauna of the California chaparral and woodlands
Moths of Central America
Moths described in 1857
Taxa named by Francis Walker (entomologist)